Nea Kerasia is a village and a community of the Thermaikos municipality. Before the 2011 local government reform it was part of the municipality of Michaniona, of which it was a municipal district. The 2011 census recorded 1,948 inhabitants in the village. The community of Nea Kerasia covers an area of 4.70 km2.

See also
 List of settlements in the Thessaloniki regional unit

References

Populated places in Thessaloniki (regional unit)